The 1995–96 season was the 115th season in the existence of FC Girondins de Bordeaux and the club's fourth consecutive season in the top flight of French football. In addition to the domestic league, Bordeaux participated in this season's editions of the Coupe de France, the Coupe de la Ligue and the UEFA Intertoto Cup. The season covered the period from 1 July 1995 to 30 June 1996.

Transfers

In

Out

Competitions

Overall record

French Division 1

League table

Results summary

Results by round

Matches

Source:

Coupe de France

Coupe de la Ligue

UEFA Intertoto Cup

References

FC Girondins de Bordeaux seasons
Bordeaux